George Bentley may refer to:

 George Bentley (publisher) (1828–1895), English publisher
 George Bentley (politician) (1842–1909), Canadian politician
 George Bentley (Shortland Street), fictional character